The 2021–22 season was Blackburn Rovers' 134th season as a professional football club. The club participated in the Championship for a fourth consecutive season. Along with competing in the Championship, the club also participated in the FA Cup and EFL Cup. The season covered the period from 1 July 2021 to 30 June 2022.

Activity

Summer activity

May

On 14 May 2021, Rovers announced their retained list, Ryan Nyambe, Joe Rothwell and Joe Rankin-Costello have had the one-year options in their contracts activated. Bradley Johnson has extended his stay by a further 12 months. Discussions are ongoing with club captain Elliott Bennett regarding the possibility of extending his stay, however he is free to consider other options. Harry Chapman has been offered a new contract.

Corry Evans, Charlie Mulgrew, Amari'i Bell, Stewart Downing, Lewis Holtby, Joe Grayson, Stefan Mols, Lewis Thompson, Ben Paton, Brad Lyons and Tom White, along with scholars James Connolly, George Wyatt and Ben Pleavin, have all been informed that they will not be retained by the club when their current contracts/agreements are due to expire on June 30th 2021

The following players from the development squad Dan Pike, Sam Burn, Sam Barnes, Louie Annesley, Jalil Saadi and Sam Durrant their time with the club has been extended. The following second year scholars have all been offered their first professional contracts with the club Lennie Cirino, Jared Harlock, Zak Gilsenan, Alex Baker and Aidan Dowling. Joe Ferguson and Brandon Lonsdale have had their scholarships extended into a third year.

On 17 May 2021, Rovers announced a new partnership with kit manufacturers Macron, with a 5 year deal agreed to become Official Technical Kit Sponsor and Supplier.

On 18 May 2021, Rovers announced u18 striker Alex Baker had signed his 1st professional contract, a 2 year deal until 2023.

On 19 May 2021, Rovers announced u23 striker Sam Burn had signed a new 1 year deal until 2022, with the option of a further 12 months.

On 20 May 2021, Rovers announced u18 goalkeeper Aidan Dowling had signed his 1st professional contract, a 2 year deal until 2023.

On 21 May 2021, Rovers announced u18 attacker Zak Gilsenan had signed his 1st professional contract, a 2 year deal until 2023.

On 22 May 2021, Rovers announced u23 defender Dan Pike had signed a new contract, a 2 year deal until 2023, with the option of a 12 month extension.

On 24 May 2021, Rovers announced defender Scott Wharton had signed a new contract, a 3 year deal until 2024 with the option of a further 12 months.

On 25 May 2021, Rovers announced u18 midfielder Jared Harlock had signed his 1st professional contract, a 2 year deal until 2023.

On 27 May 2021, Rovers announced u23 defender Lenni Cirino had signed his 1st professional contract, a 2 year deal until 2023.

On 29 May 2021, Brentford were promoted to the Premier League by way of the EFL Championship play-offs. With David Raya's promotion as a result activating a promotion bonus in which Rovers stood to gain £2 million.

June

On 3 June 2021, Rovers announced u23 midfielder Jake Garrett had signed a new long-term contract, a 4 year deal until 2025.

On 4 June 2021, Rovers announced midfielder Joe Rankin-Costello had signed a new long-term contract, a 3 year deal until 2024.

On 8 June 2021, Barrow announced the signing of Tom White following his release from Rovers.

On 14 June 2021, Rovers announced u23 goalkeeper Joe Hilton had signed a new contract, a 2 year deal until 2023.

On 15 June 2021, Dundee United announced the signing of Charlie Mulgrew following his release from Rovers, Also Rovers announced u23 defender Louie Annesley signed a new 2 year deal until 2023.

On 17 June 2021, Rovers announced midfielder Elliott Bennett will join Shrewsbury Town, Also Kilmarnock announced the signing of Brad Lyons following his release from Rovers.

On 23 June 2021, Barrow announced the signing of Joe Grayson following his release from Rovers.

On 24 June 2022, Cardiff City announced the signing of James Connolly following his release from Rovers.

On 25 June 2021, Luton Town announced the signing of Amari'i Bell following his release from Rovers.

On 28 June 2021, Rovers announced u23 goalkeeper Joe Hilton had joined Hamilton Academical on loan until the end of the season.

On 29 June 2021, Rovers announced midfielder Harry Chapman had signed a new 12 month contract until 2022.

On 30 June 2021, Rovers announced u23 defender Sam Barnes had signed a new 2 year deal until 2023.

July

On 9 July 2021, Accrington Stanley announced the signing of Ben Pleavin following his release from Rovers. Also Rovers announced u23 midfielder Sam Durrant had signed a new 1 year contract until 2022.

On 15 July 2021, Sunderland announced the signing of Corry Evans following his release from Rovers.

On 16 July 2021, Scunthorpe United announced the signing of Lewis Thompson following his release from Rovers, Rovers also announced the appointment of John Park as the club's new Head of Recruitment.

August

On 1 August 2021, Salford City announced the appointment of Rovers u23 manager Billy Barr as their assistant manager. Also Stoke City announced the appointment of Rovers head of Academy recruitment Simon Cooper in a similar role. Also Stewart Downing announced his retirement from football.

On 6 August 2021, Ross County announced the signing of Ben Paton following his release from Rovers.

On 10 August 2021, Rovers announced striker Adam Armstrong had joined Southampton for a significant undisclosed fee.

On 16 August 2021, Rovers announced the signing of midfielder Leighton Clarkson on loan from Liverpool until the end of the season.

On 17 August 2021, Holstein Kiel announced the signing of Lewis Holtby following his release from Rovers in the summer.

On 18 August 2021, Rovers announced defender Hayden Carter had signed a new contract, a 3 year deal until 2024, with the option of a 12 month extension.

On 20 August 2021, Rovers announced u23 goalkeeper Aidan Dowling had joined Halifax Town on a 1 month loan.

On 23 August 2021, Rovers announced the signing of attacking midfielder Ian Poveda on loan from Leeds United until the end of the season.

On 29 August 2021, Rovers announced the signing of defender Jan Paul van Hecke on loan from Brighton & Hove Albion until the end of the season.

On 31 August 2021, Rovers announced the signing of winger Reda Khadra on loan from Brighton & Hove Albion until the end of the season, Rovers also announced the signing of defender Tayo Edun from Lincoln City for an undisclosed fee on a 3 year deal, with the option of a further 12 months, Rovers also announced midfielder Harry Chapman had joined Burton Albion on a 6 month loan until 2 January.

September

On 3 September 2021, Rovers announced the appointment of Mike Sheron as u23 head coach making the step up from u18s.

On 4 September 2021, Rovers announced the appointment of Ryan Kidd as u18 head coach.

On 9 September 2021, Rovers announced defender Dan Pike had joined AFC Fylde on a month's loan until 9 October, Rovers also announced forward Jack Vale had joined FC Halifax Town until 2 January 2022.

October

On 2 October 2021, Ramsbottom United announced the signing of George Wyatt following his release from Rovers in the summer.

On 9 October 2021, Rovers announced u23 goalkeeper Aidan Dowling had joined Lancaster City on a month's loan until 6 November. 

On 12 October 2021, Warrington Town announced the signing of Stefan Mols following his release from Rovers in the summer.

On 16 October 2021, Rovers announced u23 forward Sam Burns had joined FC United on a month's loan until 13 November.

On 22 October 2021, Rovers announced u18 forward Brandon Lonsdale had joined Lancaster City on a month's loan until 20 November.

On 28 October 2021, Rovers announced u18 defender George Pratt had joined Hyde United on loan until 27 November.

On 29 October 2021, Rovers announced u23 defender Louie Annesley had joined Woking on loan until 4 December.

November

On 25 November 2021, Rovers announced the return of Chris Samba as an academy coach.

On 26 November 2021, Rovers announced u18 forward Brandon Lonsdale had joined Macclesfield on a short-term loan until 3 January.

Winter activity

December

On 8 December 2021, Rovers announced u18 striker Harry Leonard had signed his 1st professional contract, a long-term deal until 2025.

On 21 December 2021, Rovers announced defender Dan Pike had rejoined AFC Fylde on a month's loan until 16 January.

January

On 1 January 2022, Rovers announced forward Sam Gallagher had signed a new 2 year contract until 2024, with the option of a 12 month extension.

On 2 January 2022, Rovers announced that Leighton Clarkson had returned to Liverpool.

On 4 January 2022, Rovers announced that u23 forward Sam Burns had joined Scunthorpe United until the end of the season.

On 5 January 2022, Rovers announced u23 defender Louie Annesley had extended his stay at Woking until 15 May 22.

On 6 January 2022, Rovers announced the signing of Irish right back James Brown from Drogheda United on a free transfer following a successful trial.

On 14 January 2022, Rovers announced the signing of Dutch right back Deyovaisio Zeefuik from Hertha Berlin on loan, with a view to making the deal permanent at the end of the season.

On 15 January 2022, Rovers announced that defender Hayden Carter had joined Portsmouth until the end of the season.

On 18 January 2022, Rovers announced the signing of Dilan Markanday from Tottenham Hotspur on a 3 and half year deal, with the option of a further 12 months, for an undisclosed fee. Also Rovers announced defender Tyler Magloire had joined Northampton Town until the end of the season. Rovers also announced that Totally Wicked will be the new shirt sponsor for the rest of the season after the partnership with Recoverite Compression ended with immediate effect.

On 30 January 2022, Rovers announced the signing of Ryan Hedges from Aberdeen on a 3 and half year deal, with the option of a further 12 months, for an undisclosed fee.

On 31 January 2022, Rovers announced u23 attacker Connor McBride had joined Queens Park until the end of the season. Rovers also announced midfielder Harry Chapman had re-joined Burton Albion until the end of the season. Rovers also announced that attacker Daniel Butterworth had joined Fleetwood Town until the end of the season. Also Rovers announced the signing of English midfielder Ryan Giles from Wolverhampton Wanderers on loan until the end of the season.

February

On 11 February 2022, Rovers announced goalkeeper Thomas Kaminski had signed a new 3 and half year contract until 2025.

On 14 February 2022, Rovers announced u23 midfielder Adam Wharton had signed his 1st professional contract, a 2 and half year contract until 2024, with the option of a further 12 months.

March

On 2 March 2022, Rovers announced defender James Brown who initially joined on a 6 month deal had signed a new contract until 2024, with the option of a further 12 months.

April

On 24 April 2022, Rovers announced that the club have won the Diversity Award at this year's EFL Awards.

May

On 1 May 2022, Rovers announced u23 forward Sam Burns had signed a new 1 year contract until 2023.

On 3 May 2022, Rovers announced their end of season award winners Jan Paul van Hecke was voted Player of the Year, Reda Khadra's goal against QPR was voted Goal of the Season, John Buckley won Young Player of the Year, Ben Brereton won both Players Player of the Year and Junior Rovers Player of the Year, Darragh Lenihan was awarded a Special Club award, Sam Gallagher was awarded the Man of the Match award, Lewis Travis was awarded a Team Contribution award & Scott Wharton was awarded an Unsung Hero award.

Squad information
Players and squad numbers last updated on 16 March 2022. List is representative of players who have made an appearance for the first-team this season and of information available on Rovers.co.uk.

Note: Flags indicate national team as has been defined under FIFA eligibility rules. Players may hold more than one non-FIFA nationality.

Other players 
Players and squad numbers last updated on 16 March 2022. List below includes players that have been issued a squad number for the 2021-22 season but haven't made an appearance for the first-team and aren't listed as part of the first-team setup on Rovers.co.uk.

Note: Flags indicate national team as has been defined under FIFA eligibility rules. Players may hold more than one non-FIFA nationality.

Pre-season
Blackburn Rovers confirmed they would play friendlies against AFC Fylde, Bradford City, Leeds United and Bolton Wanderers as part of their pre-season preparations.

Competitions

Championship

League table

Results summary

Results by matchday

Matches
Rovers fixtures were announced on 24 June 2021.

FA Cup

Rovers were drawn away to Wigan Athletic in the third round.

EFL Cup

On 24 June 2021, the first round draw was confirmed.

Backroom staff

Squad statistics

Appearances and goals

|-
|colspan="14"|Players out on loan:

|-
|colspan="14"|Players that played for Blackburn Rovers this season that have left the club:

|}

Goalscorers

Transfers

Summer

Transfers in 

Total outgoing: +/- est ~£400,000

Transfers out 

 Brackets around club names indicate the player joined that club after his Blackburn Rovers contract expired.

Total incoming: +/- ~£ 0

Loans in

Loans out

Winter

Transfers in

Total outgoing: +/- ~£

Transfers out

Total incoming: +/- ~£ 0

Loans in

Loans out

References
d

Blackburn Rovers F.C. seasons
Blackburn Rovers